Annapolis National Cemetery is a United States National Cemetery located in the city of Annapolis, in Anne Arundel County, Maryland. It encompasses , and as of 2020, had over 3,100 interments. It is operated and maintained by the Baltimore National Cemetery.

History
Annapolis National Cemetery is one of the 14 national cemeteries established by Abraham Lincoln in 1862 to accommodate the dead from the American Civil War. The original plot of land was leased, and later purchased, from Judge Nicholas Brewer.

During the Civil War, Annapolis was a Union recruit training center. There was also a parole camp nearby (approximately three miles from what was then the city line) where Union prisoners who had been exchanged for Confederate prisoners were held until they could be returned to their own units.  The conditions in the camp were crowded and were not particularly sanitary; many soldiers wound up in one of the army field hospitals at the U.S. Naval Academy and at St. John's College in downtown Annapolis.  A large number succumbed to wounds they bore when they arrived, small pox, typhoid fever, dysentery or any of a number of other diseases.  Most of the original interments were men who died in the parole camp or the field hospitals. Several Confederate prisoners, and one Russian national, also died in Annapolis and are buried in the cemetery.

Many soldiers, sailors, Marines and airmen who served during, or died in, subsequent wars – as well as some of their dependents – are also interred there.

Annapolis National Cemetery was placed on the National Register of Historic Places in 1996.

See also
 United States Department of Veterans Affairs
 National Register of Historic Places listings in Anne Arundel County, Maryland

References

External links
 
 Annapolis National Cemetery Slide Show
 National Cemetery Administration
 Annapolis National Cemetery
 Navpooh's Annapolis National Cemetery Page
 
 
 , including undated photo, at Maryland Historical Trust
 

Buildings and structures in Annapolis, Maryland
Cemeteries on the National Register of Historic Places in Maryland
United States national cemeteries
Tourist attractions in Annapolis, Maryland
Historic American Landscapes Survey in Maryland
Protected areas of Anne Arundel County, Maryland
National Register of Historic Places in Annapolis, Maryland